Peter Spornberger (born 6 January 1999) is an Italian professional ice hockey player for Schwenninger Wild Wings of the Deutsche Eishockey Liga (DEL) and the Italian national team.

He represented Italy at the 2021 IIHF World Championship.

References

External links

1999 births
Living people
Expatriate ice hockey players in Germany
Italian expatriate ice hockey people
Italian expatriate sportspeople in Germany
Italian ice hockey defencemen
EHC Freiburg players
Ice hockey people from Bolzano
Germanophone Italian people
Schwenninger Wild Wings players